The 44th District of the Iowa Senate is located in southeastern Iowa, and is currently composed of Des Moines, Louisa, and Muscatine Counties.

Current elected officials
Tim Goodwin is the senator currently representing the 44th District.

The area of the 44th District contains two Iowa House of Representatives districts:
The 87th District (represented by Dennis Cohoon)
The 88th District (represented by David Kerr)

The district is also located in Iowa's 2nd congressional district, which is represented by Mariannette Miller-Meeks.

Past senators
The district has previously been represented by:

John Nystrom, 1983–1991
Albert Sorensen, 1992
Leonard Boswell, 1993–1996
Jeffrey Angelo, 1997–2002
Thomas G. Courtney, 2003–2017
Thomas Greene, 2017–2021
Tim Goodwin, 2021–present

See also
Iowa General Assembly
Iowa Senate

References

44